The October Club was a group of Tory Members of Parliament, established after the 1710 general election. The Club was active until approximately 1714. The group took its name from the strong ale they reportedly drank.

The group has been characterized as having High Church tendencies.

After the Lord High Treasurer Robert Harley refused to set up an inquiry into the former administration's financial policies, on 5 February 1711 some Tories passed resolutions calling for inquires into suspected financial abuses. Initially 70 to 80 strong, the October Club attracted not just young and inexperienced backbenchers but older Tories such as Ralph Freeman, Sir John Pakington, Sir Justinian Isham, Peter Shakerley and Sir Thomas Hanmer. The group grew to have "perhaps 200 members". The group were, according to H. T. Dickinson, "a major threat to the Harley administration". Linda Colley claims that the bulk of the membership were of Royalist ancestry.

Notes

Clubs and societies in London
Dining clubs
Tory MPs (pre-1834)